Haliclona djeedara is a demosponge, first described by Jane Fromont and David Abdo in 2014. The species epithet, djeedara, means "brown" in Nyoongar.

Description
Haliclona djeedara is a lobed, encrusting and upright sponge, which when alive, is a light brown colour. It has a springy texture and large internal canals.  It gives birth to cylindrical planktonic larvae which consist of clumps of ciliated cells. Individuals are either male or female.

Distribution
It is found on limestone reefs at depths of 3-30 m, from Jurien Bay to Bremer Bay in Western Australia.

References 

Haliclona
Chalinidae
Taxa described in 2014
Taxa named by Jane Fromont